Cape Verdeans in France are residents of France who are from Cape Verde or have Cape Verdean ancestry.                        

Cape Verdeans began arriving in France in 1964, from Rotterdam, Dakar, and Lisbon.  They took jobs in the coal mines, in the iron foundries, and as masons.  Women typically became domestics. Prior to independence in 1975, Cape Verdean immigrants were registered as Portuguese immigrants from the overseas province of Portuguese Cape Verde. The Cape Verdeans immigrants concentrated in the cities of Paris.

, it was estimated that there were 8,000 Cape Verdeans in France.  The 1999 census counted 21,000 descendants.  , the embassy in Paris had 17,544 registered Cape Verdeans.  However, that number only includes those who are documented and registered.  There are many who are undocumented or who choose not to register with the embassy.  Additionally, tabulating is difficult because many Cape Verdeans arrived in France with passports from other host countries, like Portugal or the Netherlands.  Thus, taking all these factors into consideration, the embassy estimates that there are about 21,000 Cape Verdeans and their descendants currently residing in France.        
, the Cape Verde Consulate in Marseille was attempting to help Cape Verdeans in France to find jobs.

Notable people                        

Patrick Vieira
Georges Santos
Manuel dos Santos Fernandes
Stomy Bugsy
Jacques Faty
Ricardo Faty
Mayra Andrade

References

External links                  
CIA Factbook
Cape Verdean Diaspora Population Estimates 
                 
           

African diaspora in France
 
Immigration to France by country of origin